Free inquiry may refer to:

 Free inquiry, a concept related to freethought
 Free Inquiry, a bi-monthly journal of secular humanist opinion and commentary published by the Council for Secular Humanism